Anthony Michael "Tony" Whittaker (4 May 1932 – 1 April 2016) was a British solicitor and politician, best known as the co-founder and first leader of PEOPLE, forerunner of the Green Party.

Born in Coventry, Whittaker was educated at Warwick School and the University of Birmingham.  He completed National Service with the Royal Air Force, then worked as a solicitor in Kenilworth, where he joined the Conservative Party and was elected to the local council.

In 1971, Whittaker married his second wife, Lesley Hill.  The two founded their own solicitors' practice back in Coventry.  The following year, Lesley accessed a write up in Playboy of "a candid conversation with the outspoken population biologist" Dr. Paul Ehrlich.  Inspired by the content of this interview, Tony, Lesley, and their friends Michael Benfield and Freda Sanders, organised a meeting which founded PEOPLE.  Whittaker served as the party's chair, and was election agent for Lesley's candidacies in the February and October 1974 UK general elections.

Within the party, Whittaker championed the idea of a basic income and zero growth, and was a vocal opponent of socialism.
Concerned that people did not associate the party name with its ideals, Whittaker championed the party's renaming as the Ecology Party in 1975.  However, by this point, the couple felt that the party was unlikely to achieve its ideals.  They moved to Exmoor to pursue self-sufficiency and reduced their involvement.

At the 1979 general election, Whittaker stood for the Ecology Party in North Devon, a seat held by former leader of the Liberal Party Jeremy Thorpe.  He took fourth place with 1.2% of the vote, and gained much publicity for the party.  The couple then decided to withdraw from the party, although Tony continued to attend many party conferences, and to support local party candidates.

In later years, Whittaker became manager of the post office in Hennock, and spent his spare time sailing his yacht and developing computer programmes.

References

1932 births
2016 deaths
Alumni of the University of Birmingham
Conservative Party (UK) councillors
Councillors in Warwickshire
English environmentalists
English solicitors
Green Party politicians (UK)
People educated at Warwick School
Politicians from Coventry
20th-century English lawyers
British political party founders